Benjamin Adler (10 November 1903 – 16 April 1990) was an American electrical engineer and inventor who helped develop the first commercial television set. He was born in New York City to Romanian Jewish immigrants. He graduated from the-now New York University Tandon School of Engineering.

References

1903 births
1990 deaths
American people of Romanian-Jewish descent
Polytechnic Institute of New York University alumni
American electrical engineers
20th-century American engineers
20th-century American inventors